Mundamba is a village in Khordha tehsil of Khordha district in Odisha in India.

Mundamba's temples include Lokanath temple, Laxmi Narayan temple, Mahavir temple and  Bhaghei temple.

This is 19 kilometers from Kordha, has few govt offices Irrigation office, Forest Office, Panchayat office, Police station, Post office, Schools from 1st til 10th (Primary school 1 to 5, Middle school 6-7, and High school 8-10). This place is a junction to many villages, from where people travel to Khudha, Bhubaneswar, BaluGan, Puri. The NH-5 and New Jagannath Sadak (Road) meet here, facilitating residents' travel to nearby cities.

There is a good football ground, where the inter state football matches held many times in past. The famous Hanuman temple on top of a small hill is a famous place. The yearly festival in April every month, which occurs for nine days, attracts many devotees to the beautiful place to be blessed.

References

Villages in Khordha district